Youssef Al Thuwaney (born August 14, 1977) is a Kuwaiti footballer who played for Al Arabi Kuwait of the Kuwaiti Premier League as a goalkeeper.

He played for Al-Arabi in the 2007 AFC Champions League group stage.

References

1977 births
Living people
Kuwaiti footballers
Association football goalkeepers
Kuwait international footballers
Khaitan SC players
Al-Arabi SC (Kuwait) players
Kuwait Premier League players